The 2021 Spa-Francorchamps Formula 3 round was the fifth round of the 2021 FIA Formula 3 Championship. It took place at the Circuit de Spa-Francorchamps and featured three races on the 28 August and 29 August in support of the 2021 Belgian Grand Prix.

With Jack Doohan winning both Sprint Race 2 and Feature Race respectively, it marked the first time in the series' history that a driver was able to win two races in a weekend.

Classification

Qualifying

Sprint Race 1

Sprint Race 2

Feature Race

Standings after the event 

Drivers' Championship standings

Teams' Championship standings

 Note: Only the top five positions are included for both sets of standings.

See also 
 2021 Belgian Grand Prix

References 

|- style="text-align:center"
|width="35%"|Previous race:
|width="30%"|FIA Formula 3 Championship2021 season
|width="40%"|Next race:

2021 FIA Formula 3 Championship
Spa-Francorchamps Formula 3
Spa-Francorchamps Formula 3 round